The 2014 Lewisham Council election took place on 22 May 2014 to elect members of Lewisham Council in England. This was on the same day as other local elections.

Labour won 53 of 54 seats in a landslide victory, with one seat in Brockley ward held by the Green Party.

Results

|}

Results by ward  

Other candidates with fewer than 500 votes: Conservative Party, Liberal Democrats, Green Party, TUSC.

Other candidates with fewer than 1,000 votes: Conservative Party, Liberal Democrats, Lewisham People Before Profit.

Other candidates with fewer than 500 votes: Conservative Party, Liberal Democrats, Lewisham People Before Profit, UKIP.

References

Lewisham
2014